Darab Kola (also Romanized as Dārāb Kolā and Dārāb Kalā; also known as Dārab Qal‘eh) is a village in Kuhdasht-e Gharbi Rural District, in the Central District of Miandorud County, Mazandaran Province, Iran. At the 2006 census, its population was 4,661, in 1,170 families.

References 

Populated places in Miandorud County